Chambers Street may refer to:

Streets
 Chambers Street, Edinburgh, Scotland
 Chambers Street (Manhattan), New York City, U.S.
 Chamber Street, once known as Chambers Street, London Borough of Tower Hamlets, England

New York City Subway stations 
Chambers Street (BMT Nassau Street Line), serving the 
Chambers Street–World Trade Center (IND Eighth Avenue Line), serving the 
Chambers Street station (IRT Broadway–Seventh Avenue Line), serving the 
Chambers Street station (IRT Sixth Avenue Line), on the demolished IRT Sixth Avenue Line

See also
 Chambers Street Ferry Terminal, formerly in Manhattan, New York, U.S.
 Chambers Street Theatre, formerly in Manhattan, New York, U.S.